Barthi (Urdu: بارتھی ) is a town and union council of Dera Ghazi Khan District in the Punjab province of Pakistan. The town is part of Taunsa Tehsil.  It is located at 30°33'0N 70°22'0E and has an altitude of 439 metres (1443 feet).

Barthi is the birthplace of Usman Ahmad Khan Buzdar, the former Chief Minister of Punjab.

References

Populated places in Dera Ghazi Khan District
Union councils of Dera Ghazi Khan District